Richard Brookhiser (born February 23, 1955) is an American journalist, biographer and historian. He is a senior editor at National Review. He is most widely known for a series of biographies of America's founders, including Alexander Hamilton, Gouverneur Morris, and George Washington.

Life and career
Brookhiser was born in Irondequoit, a suburb north of Rochester, New York. 
His father worked for Eastman Kodak in Rochester and was a lieutenant in the Army Air Corps during World War II.  He has written books that deal either with the nation's founding, or the principles of America's founders, including What Would the Founders Do?, a book describing how the Founding Fathers of the United States would approach topical issues that generate controversy in modern-day America.

Brookhiser began writing for National Review in 1970. "My first article, on antiwar protests in my high school, was a cover story in National Review in 1970, when I was 15."
  He earned an A.B. degree (1977) at Yale, where he was active in the Yale Political Union as a member and sometime Chairman of the Party of the Right.  In his freshman year he took a class on Thomas Jefferson taught by Garry Wills. Although admitted to Yale Law School, Brookhiser went to work full-time for National Review in 1977; by the time he was 23, he was a senior editor, the youngest in the magazine's history.  He was selected as the successor to the magazine's founder, William F. Buckley, until Buckley ultimately changed his mind.  For a short time he wrote speeches for Vice President George H. W. Bush.

He has written for a variety of magazines and newspapers. Brookhiser's work has appeared in the "Talk of the Town" section of The New Yorker magazine as well as in The New York Times, The Wall Street Journal, Cosmopolitan, The Atlantic Monthly, Time, and Vanity Fair. In 1987 he began a column for The New York Observer which he wrote until 2007.

Brookhiser both wrote and hosted the documentary films Rediscovering George Washington, by Michael Pack, broadcast on PBS on July 4, 2002, and Rediscovering Alexander Hamilton, also by Pack, broadcast on PBS on April 11, 2011. His book Alexander Hamilton, American led to the  "Alexander Hamilton: The Man Who Made Modern America" exhibition at The New-York Historical Society (2004–2005), for which he was the historian curator. He received an honorary doctorate degree in 2005 from Washington College.

In 2008, President George W. Bush awarded Brookhiser the National Humanities Medal in a White House ceremony.

Cancer and marijuana use
Brookhiser became ill with testicular cancer in 1992 and smoked marijuana to alleviate nausea from chemotherapy. (Before that, he had smoked marijuana in college about ten times, he said.)

"Because of the marijuana, my last two courses of chemotherapy were almost nausea-free," he said in 1996. "My cancer is gone now, I was lucky."

On March 6, 1996, he testified before a congressional committee about using marijuana, urging the committee members to support decriminalization of marijuana for medical purposes.

"My support for medical marijuana is not a contradiction of my principles, but an extension of them," Brookhiser told the House Judiciary Committee's Subcommittee on Crime. "I am for law and order. But crime has to be fought intelligently and the law disgraces itself when it harasses the sick. I am for traditional virtues, but if carrying your beliefs to unjust ends is not moral, it is philistine."

Personal life
He lives in Manhattan (East Village) with his wife, Jeanne Safer, a psychotherapist and author, most recently, of The Normal One. They also have a home in Ulster County in the Catskills.

Books
Give Me Liberty: A History of America's Exceptional Idea, 304 pages (Basic Books: 2019) 
John Marshall: The Man Who Made the Supreme Court, 324 pages (Basic Books: 2018) 
Founders' Son: A Life of Abraham Lincoln, 376 pages (Basic Books: 2014) 
James Madison, 304 pages (Basic Books: 2011)  
Right Time, Right Place: Coming of Age with William F. Buckley Jr. and the Conservative Movement, 272 pages (Basic Books: 2009) 
George Washington on Leadership, 269 pages (Basic Books: 2008) 
What Would the Founders Do?: Our Questions, Their Answers, 261 pages (Basic Books: 2006)   Contents links.
Gentleman Revolutionary: Gouverneur Morris, the Rake Who Wrote the Constitution, 272 pages (Free Press: 2003) 
Rules of Civility: The 110 Precepts That Guided Our First President in War and Peace, 90 pages (University of Virginia Press: 2003) 
America's First Dynasty : The Adamses, 1735–1918, 256 pages (Free Press: 2002) 
George Washington: A National Treasure, 104 pages (National Portrait Gallery, Smithsonian Institution: 2002) 
Fighting the Good Fight: A History of the New York Conservative Party, 434 pages (St. Augustine's Press: 2002) 
(Contributor) Patriot Sage: George Washington and the American Political Tradition, editors Gary L. Gregg, Matthew Spalding, William J. Bennett, 355 pages (ISI Books: 1999) 
Alexander Hamilton, American, 240 pages (Free Press: 1999) 
Founding Father: Rediscovering George Washington, 240 pages (Free Press: 1996) 
Way of the Wasp: How It Made America, and How It Can Save It, So to Speak, 171 pages (Free Press: 1990) 
The Outside Story (Doubleday reissue edition: 1986)

Notes

External links
 Personal website
 Richard Brookhiser On George Washington, transcript of conversation with David Gergen
 "Hamilton, Our Founder" by Richard Brookhiser, City Journal quarterly, summer 2004
 
 Booknotes interview with Brookhiser on The Way of the WASP, March 224, 1991.
 In Depth interview with Brookheiser, October 7, 2001 (Note: This interview was cut short due to the commencement of Operation Enduring Freedom in Afghanistan.)
 In Depth interview with Brookheiser, April 1, 2012

1955 births
Living people
American political writers
American columnists
American political commentators
American biographers
American male biographers
21st-century American historians
21st-century American male writers
National Review people
The American Spectator people
Yale University alumni
National Humanities Medal recipients
People from Irondequoit, New York
Historians from New York (state)
People from the East Village, Manhattan
American male non-fiction writers